Eastleigh is a town in Hampshire, England, between Southampton and Winchester. It is the largest town and the administrative seat of the Borough of Eastleigh, with a population of 24,011 at the 2011 census.

The town lies on the River Itchen, one of England's premier chalk streams for fly fishing, and a designated site of Special Scientific Interest. The area was originally villages until the 19th century, when Eastleigh was developed as a railway town by the London and South-Western Railway.

History 

The modern town of Eastleigh lies on the old Roman road, built in A.D.79 between Winchester (Venta Belgarum) and Bitterne (Clausentum). Roman remains discovered in the Eastleigh area, including a Roman lead coffin excavated in 1908, indicate that a settlement probably existed here in Roman times.

A Saxon village called 'East Leah' has been recorded to have existed since 932 AD. ('Leah' is an ancient Anglo-Saxon word meaning 'a clearing in a forest'). There is additional evidence of this settlement in a survey from the time which details land in North Stoneham being granted by King Æthelstan to his military aid, Alfred in 932 AD. The prefix 'Est' or 'East' is thought to refer to its location relative to the established settlement of Baddesley.

The Domesday Book of 1086 gives a more detailed account of the settlement, which is referred to as 'Estleie'.

In 1838 the London and South Western Railway Company (L&SWR) built a railway from Southampton to Winchester. It was decided to build a station near the little village of Barton. This railway station was originally named Bishopstoke Junction. In 1868 the villages of Barton and Eastley were combined into one parish. A parish church, the Church of the Resurrection, was built in the same year, at a cost of £2,300. A local noted author of many novels, Charlotte Yonge, donated £500 towards the building of the church. She was rewarded by being given the privilege to choose a name for the 'new' parish; either Barton or Eastly. She chose Eastly, but with a new modern spelling; Eastleigh. In 1891 the L&SWR Carriage and Wagon Works from Nine Elms in London were transferred to Eastleigh. This was followed by the Nine Elms Locomotive Works which were moved there in 1909.
These railway works were closed in 2006 but have since reopened, albeit on a smaller scale.

Eastleigh has seen a rapid and controlled expansion in residential, industrial and commercial development over recent years. The borough of Eastleigh was ranked the "9th best place to live in the UK 2006" by a Channel 4 programme.

The United States Navy established a naval air station on 23 July 1918 to assemble and repair Caproni Ca.5 and Airco DH.4 and DH.9 bombers for the Northern Bombing Group of the First World War. The base closed shortly after the First Armistice at Compiègne. Perhaps Eastleigh's best-known 'resident' is the Spitfire aeroplane which was built in Southampton and first flown from Eastleigh Aerodrome. A replica has recently been placed on the roundabout at the entrance to the airport.

Eastleigh Museum, which is to be found in the High Street, holds information about the town and the surrounding villages, including Bishopstoke which had been the largest residential area.

Education 

Eastleigh has two further education colleges: Barton Peveril Sixth Form College (where Colin Firth was a pupil) and Eastleigh College (both on the same road). Crestwood Community School is the secondary school for the town, and primary schools include Cherbourg Primary School, Norwood Primary School, Nightingale Primary School, the Crescent Primary School and Shakespeare Infant and Junior Schools to the north of the town.

Religion 

The Anglican parish church is All Saints in Desborough Road. The Roman Catholic Church of the Holy Cross was built in Leigh Road in 1902 to replace an early tin church. Emmanuel Baptist Church was founded in the early 1930s, in the former Desborough Mission Hall in Desborough Road. The building dates to 1905.

Eastleigh Baptist Church is situated in Wells Place and was previously called Union Baptist Church. Adjacent to the main church building is the Wells Place Centre, built on the site of a former dairy which itself replaced a bacon factory.

St Andrew's Methodist Church is located on Blenheim Road.

Junction Church has premises in Eastleigh's High Street and Thrive Church meets at the Pavilion on the Park.

Sport

Eastleigh F.C. 

Eastleigh F.C. are the town's sole senior football team playing, from 2014 to 2015, in the Conference Premier (after promotion from the Conference South in 2013–14) as well as entering the FA Cup and the FA Trophy. They are known as The Spitfires.

Solent Kestrels 
Solent Kestrels are the town and area's basketball club, and compete in the English Basketball League Division 1, the second highest level of the sport in the country, behind the nationwide British Basketball League. The team were promoted to Division 1 in 2016, after finishing as champions of Division 2 in the 2015–16 season. They are coached by Matt Guymon and play home games at the Fleming Park Leisure Centre.

Eastleigh Ladies Hockey Club 

Eastleigh Ladies Hockey Club is based in South Hampshire. It fields 2 teams in the Hampshire Women's League (playing Saturdays), as well as playing floodlit and indoor league games (playing on weekdays).

Eastleigh Rugby Football Club 

Eastleigh Rugby Football Club play from "the Hub" in Eastleigh. They currently have four senior sides, colts and young player development, their 1st XV currently play in the London 2 South West. Also based at the Hub are "the Hurricanes", a team for young adults with learning difficulties.

Eastleigh Running Club 

There is a broadly based running club.

Politics 

Eastleigh is represented in the House of Commons by Conservative MP Paul Holmes. He was first elected for the constituency at the 2019 general election with a majority of 9,147 votes, taking over from Mims Davies, the Conservative MP who took the seat in 2015. Mike Thornton of the Liberal Democrats was elected at the 2013 by-election with a majority of 1,771 votes after the resignation of Chris Huhne, in a by-election that was closely fought with UKIP coming in second and the Conservatives finishing in third place.

In 2005 Huhne had been elected as the Liberal Democrat Member of Parliament (MP) for the Eastleigh constituency after the previous MP (David Chidgey, also Liberal Democrat) retired. Eastleigh has a tradition of close contests, and Huhne narrowly beat the Conservative candidate Conor Burns with the second lowest swing against the Liberal Democrats of any seat with a retiring MP (2.6%). David Chidgey had succeeded the Conservative MP Stephen Milligan after his high-profile death. Chris Huhne was appointed as Secretary of State for Energy and Climate Change following the 2010 general election. Huhne resigned the seat in February 2013 after pleading guilty to perverting the course of justice over a 2003 speeding case.

Eastleigh Borough Council currently has 34 Liberal Democrats, 3 independent and 2 Conservative Councillors. On 1 April 2021 the town of Eastleigh became a civil parish, having previously been an unparished area within the borough.

Economy 

The B&Q head office is on Chestnut Avenue in Chandler's Ford, Eastleigh. The town was formerly home to a Mr Kipling bakery.

It was also home to a manufacturing plant owned by Prysmian Cables & Systems before it burnt down in 2008.

Transport

Air
Southampton Airport , the 20th largest airport in the UK, is located in Eastleigh. The airport is served by a dedicated mainline railway station,  which is the next station stop south (5 minutes) from Eastleigh.

Rail
Eastleigh is also the junction station for two other routes, the Eastleigh-Fareham line and the Eastleigh-Romsey line.

Bus
Eastleigh has bus services provided by Stagecoach South, Bluestar, First Hampshire & Dorset, Wilts & Dorset and Xelabus.

Road
Eastleigh is also located close to the junction between the M3 motorway and M27 motorway, giving easy road access to London, Southampton, Winchester, Bournemouth, Portsmouth and places between.

Swan Centre 

The Swan Shopping Centre opened in 1989, and was built in the heart of the town's Victorian 'grid iron' road layout and blocked off Market Street and High Street – although through access was possible for pedestrians while the centre was open. The Swan Centre included a French-style café and a new library (replacing the former library situated in the Park, now used as part of The Point)

Notable people 

Famous people linked to Eastleigh include Chrystabel Leighton-Porter, the model for the Second World War cartoon character Jane, and Benny Hill who both lived in the town. Hill's first job was at Woolworths on Leigh Road, Eastleigh. He then moved on to be a milkman for Hanns Dairies, on Factory Road, now Wells Place. His time working in Eastleigh on a horse-drawn milk float gave him his inspiration for his hit record, Ernie, The Fastest Milkman In The West. In Hill's honour, a plaque has been put up close to the site of the now demolished Hanns Dairies building and a new road has been named Benny Hill Close, though many of the people who had bought the new homes were not happy with the decision. An alternative suggestion was Cowpat Lane.

Sir Arthur Young, the eminent chief of police, was born at 55 Chamberlayne Road in 1907. Sporting notables include Tommy Green who won an Olympic Gold Medal at the 1932 Los Angeles Games in the 50K walk, and Vince Hawkins who was British Middleweight Boxing Champion in the late 1940s.

Other notable residents of Eastleigh include:
 Heinz Burt (1942–2000) (pop-musician)
 Scott Mills (1973–present) (Radio 1 DJ)
 Stephen Gough (the 'Naked Rambler')
 Giz Watson (Australian politician)
 Nirmal Purja (Mountaineer)
 Paige Wooding (professional wrestler known as Jamie Hayter)

Twin towns and sister cities 
Eastleigh is twinned with:
 Villeneuve-Saint-Georges, France
 Kornwestheim, Germany

It has a "sister city" relationship with:
 Temple Terrace, Florida, United States

"friendship link" with  Kimry was suspended due to Russian invasion of Ukraine

See also 

 Eastleigh constituency
 Eastleigh Works

References

Notes

Bibliography

External links 

 Eastleigh Borough Council

 
Towns in Hampshire
Civil parishes in Hampshire
Borough of Eastleigh
Railway towns in England